The 172nd Division was created in February 1949 under the Regulation of the Redesignations of All Organizations and Units of the Army, issued by Central Military Commission on November 1, 1948, basing on the 28th Brigade of Tongbai Military District. Its history could be traced to Independent Brigade of Jinan Military District formed in December 1945.

The division was composed of 514th, 515th and 516th Infantry Regiments. As a part of 58th Corps, during the Chinese Civil War the division took part in the creation of Tongbai base area and Xiangfan Campaign.

In June 1949 the division was renamed as 4th Independent Division of Hubei Military District().

In February 1950 the division was inactivated. Its headquarters merged with Engineer Command, Fourth Field Army.

References

中国人民解放军各步兵师沿革，http://blog.sina.com.cn/s/blog_a3f74a990101cp1q.html

Infantry divisions of the People's Liberation Army
Military units and formations established in 1949
Military units and formations disestablished in 1950